Kevin Scott (born July 17, 1983) is a former professional Canadian football long snapper and linebacker who played for six seasons in the Canadian Football League. He played CIS Football at Queen's.

Professional career

Saskatchewan Roughriders
Scott was originally signed by the Saskatchewan Roughriders as an undrafted free agent in 2008 and played in two seasons for the team. He was released by the Roughriders on May 27, 2010.

Hamilton Tiger-Cats
After sitting out the 2010 season, Scott signed with the Hamilton Tiger-Cats on June 7, 2011. He played for the Tiger-Cats for three years and became a free agent on February 11, 2014.

Ottawa Redblacks
On February 12, 2014, Scott signed with the expansion Ottawa Redblacks. He played in 17 regular season games in 2014 where he had 10 special teams tackles. He announced his retirement on February 13, 2015, with the intention to become a police officer.

References

External links
Ottawa Redblacks bio

1983 births
Living people
Canadian football defensive linemen
Canadian football long snappers
Hamilton Tiger-Cats players
Ottawa Redblacks players
Canadian football people from Ottawa
Players of Canadian football from Ontario
Queen's Golden Gaels football players
Saskatchewan Roughriders players